Nicolai Flø Jepsen (born 25 September 1995) is a Danish professional footballer who plays as a goalkeeper for SønderjyskE.

Club career

Silkeborg IF
After having played youth football for Silkeborg IF, Flø was promoted to the first team on 23 May 2014, where he signed a professional contract. He signed a two-year contract. On 1 June 2016, after spending two years as a backup behind first goalkeeper, Thomas Nørgaard, it was announced that he would leave the club on a free transfer.

Vendsyssel FF
On 12 June 2016, Flø joined Vendsyssel FF on a two-year deal. Flø made his professional first-team debut on 24 July 2016, starting in a 1–0 home defeat against HB Køge. Afterwards, he stated that he wanted to play as a starter, and that he regarded the competition with fellow Vendsyssel-goalkeeper, Simon Enevoldsen as "healthy".

On 20 February 2018, Flø signed a new contract with Vendsyssel, keeping him at the club until 2020. At the end of the 2017-18 season, Flø and Vendsyssel FF reached promotion to the Danish Superliga after reaching third place during regular season and beating Lyngby Boldklub over two matches in a direct battle for a spot in the Superliga. On 27 May 2018, in the second and final match against Lyngby, Flø saved a penalty by Herolind Shala in a match that ended in a 3–1 win for Vendsyssel. Thereby, Vendsyssel FF secured promotion to the Superliga for the first time in the history of the club.

SønderjyskE
On 13 August 2020, Flø moved to SønderjyskE on a free transfer, signing a two-year deal.

References

External links
 
 Nicolai Flø at DBU

1995 births
Living people
People from Skanderborg Municipality
Danish men's footballers
Danish Superliga players
Danish 1st Division players
Silkeborg IF players
Vendsyssel FF players
SønderjyskE Fodbold players
Denmark youth international footballers
Association football goalkeepers
Sportspeople from the Central Denmark Region